This is a list of people who served as Lord Lieutenant of Glamorgan.  After 1729, all Lords Lieutenant were also Custos Rotulorum of Glamorgan. The post was abolished on 31 March 1974.

Lord Lieutenants of Glamorgan to 1974
Henry Herbert, 2nd Earl of Pembroke 24 February 1587 – 19 January 1601
Edward Somerset, 4th Earl of Worcester 17 July 1602 – 3 March 1628 jointly with
Henry Somerset, 5th Earl of Worcester 3 December 1626 – 9 May 1629
William Compton, 1st Earl of Northampton 9 May 1629 – 24 June 1630
John Egerton, 1st Earl of Bridgwater 11 July 1631 – 1642
Interregnum
Richard Vaughan, 2nd Earl of Carbery 22 December 1660 – 20 July 1672
Henry Somerset, 1st Duke of Beaufort 20 July 1672 – 22 March 1689
Charles Gerard, 1st Earl of Macclesfield 22 March 1689 – 7 January 1694
Thomas Herbert, 8th Earl of Pembroke 11 May 1694 – 2 October 1715
vacant
Charles Powlett, 3rd Duke of Bolton 13 January 1729 – 26 August 1754
Other Windsor, 4th Earl of Plymouth 6 November 1754 – 1771
John Stuart, 4th Earl of Bute 22 May 1772 – 14 March 1793
John Stuart, Lord Mount Stuart 14 March 1793 – 22 January 1794
vacant. Deputy Lieutenants acting during vacancy:
George Aubrey
John Price
John Richards
John Stuart, 1st Marquess of Bute 24 December 1794 – 16 November 1814
John Crichton-Stuart, 2nd Marquess of Bute 2 June 1815 – 18 March 1848
Christopher Rice Mansel Talbot, Esq. 4 May 1848 – 17 January 1890
Robert Windsor-Clive, 1st Earl of Plymouth 26 June 1890 – 6 March 1923
Ivor Windsor-Clive, 2nd Earl of Plymouth 12 April 1923 – 1 October 1943
Sir Gerard Bruce 3 December 1943 – 16 July 1952
Sir Cennyd George Traherne, K.G., T.D. 16 July 1952 – 31 March 1974†

† Became Lord Lieutenant of Mid Glamorgan, South Glamorgan and West Glamorgan from 1 April 1974.

Deputy lieutenants
A deputy lieutenant of Glamorgan is commissioned by the Lord Lieutenant of Glamorgan. Deputy lieutenants support the work of the lord-lieutenant. There can be several deputy lieutenants at any time, depending on the population of the county. Their appointment does not terminate with the changing of the lord-lieutenant, but they usually retire at age 75.

19th Century
28 February 1846: Richard Bassett, Esq.
28 February 1846: The Lord Aberdare, 
28 February 1846: William Meyrick, Esq.
28 February 1846: Thomas Powell, Esq.
28 February 1846: Evan Williams, Esq.

References

 

 The Lord-Lieutenants Order 1973 (1973/1754)

1974 disestablishments in Wales
Glamorgan
Glamorgan